Brajesh Pathak (born 25 June 1964) is an Indian politician and Member of 18th Legislative Assembly of Uttar Pradesh, Currently he is serving as the Deputy Chief Minister & Cabinet Minister of Legislative, Justice, Rural Engineering service in the Uttar Pradesh Government. He is also an ex Member of Parliament of Unnao from 2004 to 2009.

He is the member of legislative assembly from Lucknow Contonment constituency after winning 2022 state assembly elections.

Early life and education
Brajesh Pathak was born in Brahman family on 25 June 1964 to Pandit Suresh Pathak in Mallawan, Hardoi district, Uttar Pradesh. He is a lawyer by profession. He received a degree of Bachelor of Laws (LLB) from University of Lucknow.

Political career
In 2004, Pathak was asked to work for the Bahujan Samaj Party (BSP) and became the Member of Parliament. In the next few years he was entrusted with the responsibility of organising the party's activities for the entirety of Uttar Pradesh.

He joined Bharatiya Janata Party in presence of its national president Amit Shah and Union minister Mahesh Sharma in Lucknow.
In 17th Legislative Assembly of Uttar Pradesh (2017) elections, he was elected Member of the Legislative Assembly (MLA) from Lucknow Central of Lucknow district in Uttar Pradesh. He defeated his nearest rival Samajwadi Party candidate Ravidas Mehrotra by a margin of 5,094 votes. After winning this seat, he was appointed Cabinet Minister of Law & Justice in the Government of Uttar Pradesh.

On 21 August 2019, after the first cabinet expansion of Yogi Adityanath his ministry department changed as Minister of Legislative, Justice, Rural Engineering service.
On 25 March 2022, he became Deputy Chief Minister of Uttar Pradesh along with Keshav Prasad Maurya.

Personal life 
On August 5, 2020, he was infected with COVID-19.

References

External links
 Official biographical sketch in Parliament of India website
 जानिए कौन हैं बृजेश पाठक? उत्‍तर प्रदेश की राजनीति में हैं अहम चेहरा

1964 births
Living people
People from Hardoi
Politicians from Lucknow
People from Unnao district
Bahujan Samaj Party politicians from Uttar Pradesh
Rajya Sabha members from Uttar Pradesh
Bharatiya Janata Party politicians from Uttar Pradesh
State cabinet ministers of Uttar Pradesh
Uttar Pradesh MLAs 2017–2022
Yogi ministry
India MPs 2004–2009
Uttar Pradesh MLAs 2022–2027